"Le Boudin", officially "Marche de la Légion Étrangère" (English "March of the Foreign Legion"), is the official march of the Foreign Legion. "Le Boudin" is a reference to boudin, a type of blood sausage or black pudding. "Le boudin" colloquially meant the gear (rolled up in a blanket) that used to be carried atop the backpacks of Legionnaires.

Overview

The song relates the Legion's feat of arms in Tuyên Quang (1884–1885) and in Camerone (1863), the date of which (April 30) is celebrated as the Legion's anniversary.

While the tune was composed prior to the Legion's departure for Mexico in the 1860s, the lyrics were progressively composed after the Franco-Prussian War since Alsatians and Lorrains flocked to the legion after the regions were annexed by Germany. The song makes also repeated reference to the fact that the Belgians are "lazy shirkers", which comes from the fact that Belgian King Leopold II, who wished to remain neutral in the Franco-German conflict, asked the French government not to commit the Belgian Legionnaires into the conflict. France agreed, and the Belgian Legionnaires remained in French Algeria, the Legion's home, to the dismay of the rest of the Legionnaires. The song thus says that there is no blood sausage (boudin) for the Belgians. The song also mentions the Swiss who constituted the most important foreign contingent of the Legion in the 1870s.

Another hypothesis suggests that because the Legion accepted no Frenchmen (hence the adjective in its name), a Frenchman wishing to join could do so only by pretending to be a (French-speaking) foreigner, a Belgian. Since a person wishing to remain anonymous and lie about his identity often turned out to be a criminal wanting to evade the law and a prison sentence, and criminals rarely make the best soldiers, the "Belgians" ended up with a bad reputation.

Presentation
"Le Boudin" is sung while standing to attention or marching by all ranks of the Foreign Legion. The Legion marches at only 88 steps per minute, much slower than the 120 steps per minute of all other French military units. Consequently, the Legion contingent at the Bastille Day military parade march brings up the rear. Nevertheless, the Legion gets the most enthusiastic response from the crowd.

In films
The song is sung by the depleted half-company of Legionnaires in P. C. Wren's classic novel Beau Geste when the tiny garrison fool the besieging Tuaregs into thinking that they are still at full strength. The Hollywood versions of Beau Geste don't include this vital part of the story, but the 1982 mini-series by the BBC stays true to the book and shows the soldiers singing the song. 
The 1978 film March or Die also features legionnaires singing the song, at the command of their officer Major Foster, played by Gene Hackman. 
The song also appears in the 1998 film Legionnaire starring Jean-Claude Van Damme, though in this film the soldiers don't sing the song to its traditional tune.
In the Netflix series Undercover, part of this song is sung by Legio Patria Nostra in order to identify whether the main character, Bob Lemmens is really a Foreign Legionnaire or an imposter; to which Bob responds with correct lyrics.
In the 2022 French-German experimental drama film Human Flowers of Flesh the song is sung in its entirety on the soundtrack while a legionnaire makes his bed.

Lyrics

References

External links
Le Boudin mp3 audio

French Foreign Legion
French military marches